Jean-Yves Hasselin, is a French offshore sailor, he competed 1992–1993 Vendée Globe which is the pinnacle solo round the world race he was the last finisher in 7th onboard PRB/Solo Nantes  in a time of 153 days 5 hrs and 14 minutes with half the fleet not finishing.

References 

Year of birth missing (living people)
Living people
IMOCA 60 class sailors
French male sailors (sport)
Vendée Globe finishers
1992 Vendee Globe sailors
French Vendee Globe sailors
Single-handed circumnavigating sailors